The 1946–47 BAA season was the first season of the Philadelphia Warriors in the BAA (which later became the NBA). The Warriors finished the season winning their first Championship.

Roster

Regular season

Season standings

Record vs. opponents

Game log

Playoffs

|- align="center" bgcolor="#ccffcc"
| 1
| April 2
| St. Louis
| W 73–68
| Angelo Musi (19)
| Philadelphia Arena8,273
| 1–0
|- align="center" bgcolor="#ffcccc"
| 2
| April 5
| @ St. Louis
| L 51–73
| Angelo Musi (12)
| St. Louis Arena
| 1–1
|- align="center" bgcolor="#ccffcc"
| 3
| April 6
| @ St. Louis
| W 75–59
| Joe Fulks (24)
| St. Louis Arena
| 2–1
|-

|- align="center" bgcolor="#ccffcc"
| 1
| April 12
| New York
| W 82–70
| Joe Fulks (24)
| Philadelphia Arena
| 1–0
|- align="center" bgcolor="#ccffcc"
| 2
| April 14
| @ New York
| W 72–53
| Joe Fulks (16)
| Madison Square Garden III
| 2–0
|-

|- align="center" bgcolor="#ccffcc"
| 1
| April 16
| Chicago
| W 84–71
| Joe Fulks (37)
| Howie Dallmar (4)
| Philadelphia Arena7,918
| 1–0
|- align="center" bgcolor="#ccffcc"
| 2
| April 17
| Chicago
| W 85–74
| Howie Dallmar (18)
| Ralph Kaplowitz (2)
| Philadelphia Arena7,604
| 2–0
|- align="center" bgcolor="#ccffcc"
| 3
| April 19
| @ Chicago
| W 75–72
| Joe Fulks (26)
| —
| Chicago Stadium2,209
| 3–0
|- align="center" bgcolor="#ffcccc"
| 4
| April 20
| @ Chicago
| L 73–74
| George Senesky (24)
| Jerry Fleishman (4)
| Chicago Stadium1,934
| 3–1
|- align="center" bgcolor="#ccffcc"
| 5
| April 22
| Chicago
| W 83–80
| Joe Fulks (34)
| Howie Dallmar (4)
| Philadelphia Arena8,221
| 4–1
|-

Player statistics

Regular season
Bold – Leaders (qualified)
* – Recorded statistics when playing for Philadelphia

|
| 60 || – || – || .280|| – || .640 || – || 1.7 || – || – || 8.8
|-
|
| 59 || – || – || .261|| – || .543 || – || .7 || – || – || 4.5
|-
|
| 60 || – || – || .305 || – || .730 || – || .4 || – || – || 23.2
|-
|
| 47 || – || – || .269 || – || .553 || – || .2 || – || – || 1.7
|-
|
| 60 || – || – || .291 || – || .723 || – || .7 || – || – || 6.0
|-
|*
| 30 || – || – || .291 || – || .738 || – || .4 || – || – || 7.0
|-
|*
| 11 || – || – || .200 || – || .667 || – || .0 || – || – || .7
|-
|
| 60 || – || – || .281 || – || .829 || – || .4 || – || – || 9.4
|-
|
| 51 || – || – || .209 || – || .612 || – || .5 || – || – || 2.9
|-
|
| 50 || – || – || .299 || – || .489 || – || .4 || – || – || 2.5
|-
|
| 58 || – || – || .267 || – || .661 || – || .6 || – || – || 6.3
|-
|*
| 22 || – || – || .199 || – || .615 || – || .2 || – || – || 3.4
|}

Playoffs

|
| 10 || – || – || .250|| – || .750 || – || 1.6 || – || – || 8.2
|-
|
| 9 || – || – || .314|| – || .722 || – || .3 || – || – || 6.3
|-
|
| 10 || – || – || .288 || – || .787 || – || .3 || – || – || 22.2
|-
|
| 8 || – || – || .111 || – || .400 || – || .0 || – || – || 0.5
|-
|
| 10 || – || – || .264 || – || .848 || – || .8 || – || – || 8.7
|-
|
| 10 || – || – || .224 || – || .815 || – || .6 || – || – || 6.6
|-
|
| 10 || – || – || .300 || – || .724 || – || .5 || – || – || 11.7
|-
|
| 9 || – || – || .083 || – || .000 || – || .3 || – || – || 0.2
|-
|
| 7 || – || – || .231 || – || 1.000 || – || .0 || – || – || 1.0
|-
|
| 10 || – || – || .317 || – || .808 || – || .8 || – || – || 10.9
|}

Transactions

Purchases

Awards and records
 Joe Fulks, NBA Scoring Champion
 Joe Fulks, All-NBA First Team

References

Golden State Warriors seasons
Philadelphia
NBA championship seasons